Partu is an Indian Marathi language film directed by Nitin Adsul. The film stars Kishor Kadam, Smita Tambe, Navni Parihar, Yash Pandey and Saurabh Gokhale. Music by Shashank Powar. The film was released on 4 December 2015.

Synopsis 
A farmer and a child embark on a life-long journey.

Cast 
 Kishor Kadam
 Smita Tambe
 Navni Parihar
 Yash Pandey
 Saurabh Gokhale
 Gayatri Deshmukh
 Raja Bundela
 Ravi Bhushan Bhartiya 
 Anshuman Vichare

Soundtrack

Critical response 
Partu film received mixed reviews from critics. Mihir Bhanage of The Times of India gave the film a rating of 2.5/5 and wrote "These veer the film away from its main focus and once that happens, there’s no getting back on track. The slow pace makes the acting efforts of the cast go in vain". Ganesh Matkari of Pune Mirror wrote "It suddenly makes the film more palatable, a pleasant reminder that even when things are going wrong, there always exists a possibility for the happy ending we all deserve". Soumitra Pote of Maharashtra Times gave the film 3 stars out of 5 and wrote "Overall, this fact is really shocking. But humanity is constantly glorified by this". Gurav Chaitali of Loksatta wrote "This story of two ordinary families takes many turns in the course of time, but creates a unique vision of humanity".

Accolades

References

External links
 
 

2015 films
2010s Marathi-language films
Indian drama films